Jake Zimmerman (born July 5, 1974) is the Democratic St. Louis County Assessor. He was a candidate in the 2020 Democratic primary for St. Louis County Executive. He was a candidate for Missouri Attorney General in the 2016 election.  He is also a former member of the Missouri House of Representatives from the 83rd district.

Early life and career
Jake Zimmerman attended Clayton High School.  He then went on to attend Claremont McKenna College and Harvard Law School.  He has worked as a litigator at Thompson Coburn.  He is a member of the Congregation B'nai Amoona.  In addition he is a board member of the Crown Center, a board member of the American Jewish Committee, and a former at-large member of the St. Louis Jewish Community Relations Council.  Jake and his wife, Megan, live in Olivette with their son Gabriel.

Political career
Jake Zimmerman was deputy chief counsel to former Governor of Missouri Bob Holden.  Zimmerman was also Assistant Attorney General under Jay Nixon.  Zimmerman was elected to the Missouri House of Representatives in November 2006 and reelected in 2008 and 2010.  In 2011 he ran for St. Louis County Assessor.  He faced Chip Wood, the Republican nominee, in the general election.  He was elected with 63.7% of the vote  and re-elected in 2014 and 2018.

Electoral history

References

External links 
 Campaign Website
 Official House bio
 Interest Group Ratings
 Campaign Finance Information

Democratic Party members of the Missouri House of Representatives
Living people
Politicians from St. Louis
Harvard Law School alumni
Claremont McKenna College alumni
1974 births